O'Brien's Tower marks the highest point of the Cliffs of Moher, a very popular tourist destination in County Clare, Ireland. It is located a short distance from the villages Doolin and Liscannor.

History 
The tower was built on the cliffs in 1835 by local landlord and MP Sir Cornellius O'Brien as an observation tower for the English tourists who frequented the cliffs at the time: "strangers visiting the Magnificent Scenery of this neighbourhood". It is said to have initially served as a teahouse, featuring a large round table with seats of ironwork. 

Another version tells of O'Brien building the tower in order to impress women he was courting. On a clear day the view can extend as far as Loop Head at the southern tip of Clare and beyond to the mountains of Kerry. Looking north from O'Brien's Tower on clear days, the Twelve Bens in Connemara (also known as the Twelve Pins) beyond Galway Bay can be seen, and typically the Aran Islands to the west.

References

 Portrait of Ireland: Landscapes, Treasures, Traditions (Dorling Kindersley Travel Guides), 1 August 2000,

External links

Irish Coast Guard Doolin Unit
The Cliffs of Moher and O'Brien's Tower

Buildings and structures in County Clare
Towers in the Republic of Ireland
Towers completed in 1835